was the 9th daimyō of Kubota Domain in Dewa Province, Japan (modern-day Akita Prefecture), and then 27th hereditary chieftain of the Satake clan. His courtesy title was Ukyō-no-daifu and Jijū and his Court rank was Junior Fourth Rank, Lower Grade.

Biography
Satake Yoshimasa was  the eldest son of Satake Yoshiatsu. He was made heir in 1778 and became daimyō on his father's death in 1785.  He was received in formal audience by Shōgun Tokugawa Ienari in 1788. In 1790, he established the domain academy Meitokukan, entering into his domain the same year. In 1791, he ordered the planting of extensive windbreaks to improve on crop yields, and from 1792 also developed sericulture and lacquerware as industries to increase the revenues of the domain, bringing in experts from around the country. From 1793 he began a program to increase rice production by redeveloping unused land, seizing it from recalcitrant retainers when necessary. From 1795, he reformed the domain's system of local magistrates to remove incompetent or corrupt individuals. From 1805, he hired specialists in forestry management to develop timber as another resource for the domain. 

In 1807, the Russian-American Company landed on Iturup island in the Kuriles, attacking the Japanese garrison. Kubota Domain was ordered to reinforce the defenses of Ezo and the northern islands and Yoshikazu sent a detachment of 600 men. The domain also established a trading post and attempt to establish trade with the local Ainu in 1814, but the venture was not an economic success. Yoshimasa died at Kubota Castle in 1815. A prolific poet and calligrapher, he left many works. He was married to a daughter of Hotta Masanari of Sakura Domain.<ref name="Shichinomiya"

See also
Satake clan

References 

1775 births
1815 deaths
Satake clan
Tozama daimyo
People of Edo-period Japan